The women's high jump at the 2022 World Athletics U20 Championships was held at the Estadio Olímpico Pascual Guerrero on 4 and 6 August.

20 athletes from 13 countries were entered to the competition. Since only two athletes per nation can compete in each event, the third entered athlete from Estonia, Liisa-Maria Lusti did not compete in high jump, but heptathlon instead, reduced the number of athletes to 19.

Records
U20 standing records prior to the 2022 World Athletics U20 Championships were as follows:

Results

Qualification
The qualification round took place on 4 August, in two groups, both starting at 16:12. Athletes attaining a mark of at least 1.85 metres ( Q ) or at least the 12 best performers ( q ) qualified for the final.

Final
The final started at 15:35 on 6 August.

References

High jump
High jump at the World Athletics U20 Championships